The Colo Colo–Cobreloa rivalry is a footballing rivalry between Chilean clubs Colo-Colo and Cobreloa. It is considered to be one of the biggest rivalry matches in Chile.

History

References

Colo
Cob
Colo